A suicide car bombing occurred in Ghazni, Afghanistan on 7 July 2019. It killed 14 people and injured another 180. The Taliban has claimed responsibility for the attack.

See also 
July 2019 Kabul attack (disambiguation)

References 

2019 murders in Afghanistan
2019 bombing
21st-century mass murder in Afghanistan
Attacks on buildings and structures in Afghanistan 
Islamic terrorist incidents in 2019
July 2019 crimes in Asia
July 2019 events in Afghanistan
Mass murder in 2019
Suicide bombings in 2019
Suicide car and truck bombings in Afghanistan
Taliban bombings
Terrorist incidents in Afghanistan in 2019
Attacks in Afghanistan in 2019